Body Scent, is a 1983 Yugoslav drama film directed by Živojin Pavlović.

It won four awards at the 1983 Pula Film Festival, including for Best Film, Best Screenplay (Živojin Pavlović and Slobodan Golubović Leman), Best Actress (Ljiljana Medješi) and Best Supporting Actor (Zijah Sokolović).

References

External links

Body Scent at Filmovi.com 

1983 films
1983 drama films
Serbian drama films
Serbo-Croatian-language films
Films directed by Živojin Pavlović
Yugoslav drama films
Films set in Serbia